Frederick William Kaess (December 1, 1910 – March 30, 1979) was a United States district judge of the United States District Court for the Eastern District of Michigan.

Education and career

Kaess was born in Detroit, Michigan on December 1, 1910, the son of Frederick Charles Kaess Jr. and Dorothy Koch Kaess. He received his earliest education in the public schools of Detroit, graduated from Lake Shore High School of suburban St. Clair Shores, Michigan, and received a Bachelor of Laws from Detroit College of Law (now Michigan State University College of Law) in 1932. He was a municipal judge for St. Clair Shores, Michigan from 1932 to 1933. He was an attorney and claims manager for the Michigan Mutual Liability Company from 1933 to 1945. He was a deputy commissioner for the Workmen's Compensation Commission in Lansing, Michigan from 1939 to 1940. He was in private practice in Detroit from 1945 to 1953. He was the United States Attorney for the Eastern District of Michigan from 1953 to 1960.

Federal judicial service

On June 10, 1960, Kaess was nominated by President Dwight D. Eisenhower to a seat on the United States District Court for the Eastern District of Michigan vacated by Judge Arthur F. Lederle. Kaess was confirmed by the United States Senate on July 2, 1960, and received his commission on July 6, 1960. He served as Chief Judge from 1972 to 1975, assuming senior status on December 13, 1975 and serving in that capacity until his death on March 30, 1979.

References

Sources
 

1910 births
1979 deaths
Lawyers from Detroit
Judges of the United States District Court for the Eastern District of Michigan
United States district court judges appointed by Dwight D. Eisenhower
20th-century American judges
Detroit College of Law alumni
20th-century American lawyers